Lucerne-Land District is one of the two new Wahlkreis formed from the former Lucerne Amt in 2013 in the Canton of Lucerne, Switzerland.

Mergers
The new Wahlkreis was created on 1 January 2013.

References

Districts of the canton of Lucerne